Sigtrygg was a powerful man in Nerike who received Saint Olaf. He is said to have been the ancestor of a Swedish noble family named Natt och Dag (night and day).

Swedish nobility